Henry L. Gogerty (1894–1990) was an American architect. He is best known for designing over 350 schools and industrial buildings in Southern California.

Biography

Early life
He was born on January 30, 1894, in Zearing, Iowa. He received a Liberal Arts certificate from the University of Dubuque in 1913, graduated from the University of Illinois at Urbana–Champaign in 1917, and later received a degree in architecture from the University of Southern California. During the First World War, he served in the field artillery.

Career
Together with Carl Jules Weyl (1890-1948), he designed the Spanish Baroque Palace Theater, now known as the Avalon Hollywood, located at 1735 North Vine Street in Hollywood, Los Angeles, in 1926-1927. Alternatively, in 1926, they designed the Spanish Colonial Baine Building located at 6601-09 Hollywood Boulevard, built for Colonel Harry Baine (1884-1945). As such, Baine was "the first person to live in a penthouse on Hollywood Boulevard," and his downstairs tenants were the Merchants National Trust and Savings Bank. In 1927, they designed a building located at 6654 Hollywood Boulevard. In 1928, they designed shops and studios for Fred Thomson (1890-1928). In 1929, they designed the Yucca Vine Tower, a 112-foot, eight-floor building located at 6305-09 Yucca Street in  the Yucca Corridor area of Hollywood. In 1928, he designed the Grand Central Air Terminal of the Glendale Airport in Glendale, California.

In 1930, he designed a dance studio located at 6274-84 Yucca Street in Hollywood. In 1936, he designed the Compton branch of the Los Angeles Public Library. From 1936 to 1938, he designed the Susan Miller Dorsey High School in South Los Angeles. From 1941 to 1942, he designed the factory of the Hughes Aircraft Company in Culver City, California. From 1942 to 1943, he designed the Naval Ordnance Test Station of the United States Navy in Inyokern, California.

In 1950, he designed Union High School in Visalia, California. In 1956, together with D. Stewart Kerr, he designed the new buildings of Gardena High School in Gardena, California. From 1957 to 1958, he designed another factory for the Hughes Aircraft Company, this time in Fullerton, California. In 1959, he designed the new campus of Antelope Valley College in Lancaster, California. In 1961, he designed new buildings for Allan Hancock College, a community college in Santa Maria, California. In 1963, he designed the buildings of the South Hills High School in West Covina, California.

He designed the bedrooms of the Biltmore Hotel in Palm Springs, California, while the building itself was designed by architect Frederick Monhoff (1897–1975); it was demolished in 2003. He also designed and operated the Desert Air Hotel and Palm Desert Airpark in Rancho Mirage, California, until 1968.

He sat on the Board of Trustees of the St. Anne's Foundation and was the recipient of the  Angel Award in 1988.

Personal life
He got married in 1922 and divorced in 1930. He died on January 4, 1990, in Los Angeles County, California.

References

1894 births
1990 deaths
People from Story County, Iowa
University of Illinois Urbana-Champaign alumni
USC School of Architecture alumni
United States Army personnel of World War I
20th-century American architects